Dudkino is a rural locality (a village) in Oktyabrskoye Rural Settlement, Vyaznikovsky District, Vladimir Oblast, Russia. The population was 14 as of 2010.

Geography 
Dudkino is located 18 km southwest of Vyazniki (the district's administrative centre) by road. Serkovo is the nearest rural locality.

References 

Rural localities in Vyaznikovsky District